Sir David Robert Sterling  (born 7 March 1958) is a Northern Irish civil servant. Since 2017, he was the Interim Head of the Northern Ireland Civil Service, Permanent Secretary of the Executive Office, and Secretary to Northern Ireland Executive: as such, he was the most senior civil servant in Northern Ireland.
He was appointed Knight Commander of the Order of the Bath (KCB) in the 2020 Birthday Honours. He stepped down as Head of the Northern Ireland Civil Service on 31 August 2020, after 42 years as a civil servant. He is a keen golfer who plays at Malone Golf Club, Belfast.

References

 

 

1958 births
Living people
Civil servants from Northern Ireland
Heads of the Northern Ireland Civil Service
Knights Commander of the Order of the Bath